Paul Farrell-Turepu is a Cook Island professional football manager.

Career
In November 2011 Farrell-Turpen was appointed caretaker coach of the Cook Islands national football team.

References

External links

Year of birth missing (living people)
Living people
Cook Island football managers
Cook Islands national football team managers
Place of birth missing (living people)